Edouard Heene (27 Jul 1872 – 24 Jul 1947) was a Belgian master builder in the Meetjesland late in the 19th and early in the 20th century.  He was a major figure in the monumental architectural development of Eeklo; among his projects was the City Hall with Belfry of Eeklo (UNESCO World Heritage Site).

Gallery

Honours
Pro Ecclesia et Pontifice

References

External links

Edouard Heene Flanders Heritage Agency
Edouard Heene Geneanet
Edouard Heene Het Nieuwsblad

1872 births
1947 deaths
People from Eeklo
Belgian architects